Njarðvík women's basketball, commonly known as Njarðvík, is the women's basketball department of Ungmennafélag Njarðvíkur, based in the town of Reykjanesbær in Iceland. It won the national championship and the basketball cup in 2012. As of the 2020–2021 season, the team plays in the second-tier 1. deild kvenna.

Arena
Njarðvík plays its home games at Íþróttahús Njarðvíkur, commonly nicknamed Ljónagryfjan (English: The Lion's Den).

Trophies and awards

Trophies
Úrvalsdeild
 Winners: 2012, 2022

Icelandic Basketball Cup
 Winners: 2012

Icelandic Basketball Supercup: :
 Winners: 2002, 2022

Division I
 Winners (5): 2000, 2001, 2009, 2015, 2021

Awards
Úrvalsdeild Women's Foreign Player of the Year
 Lele Hardy – 2012, 2013

Úrvalsdeild Women's Domestic All-First Team
 Harpa Magnúsdóttir – 1989
 Petrúnella Skúladóttir – 2012

Úrvalsdeild kvenna Playoffs MVP
 Lele Hardy – 2012
 Aliyah Collier – 2022

Úrvalsdeild kvenna Coach of the Year
 Suzette Sargeant – 1996
 Einar Árni Jóhannsson – 2003
 Sverrir Þór Sverrisson – 2012

1. deild kvenna Foreign Player of the Year
Chelsea Nacole Jennings – 2021

1. deild kvenna Domestic All-First team
Kamilla Sól Viktorsdóttir – 2019
Vilborg Jónsdóttir	 – 2021

1. deild kvenna Young Player of the Year
Vilborg Jónsdóttir – 2019

1. deild kvenna Coach of the Year
Rúnar Ingi Erlingsson – 2021

Notable players

Coaches

References

Njarðvík (basketball)